The  Breeders' Cup Mile is a  Grade 1 Weight for Age stakes race for thoroughbred racehorses three years old and up, run on a grass course. It has been conducted annually as part of the Breeders' Cup World Championships since the event's inception in 1984. All Breeders' Cups to date have been held in the United States except for the 1996 event in Canada.

The purse was raised from $1.5 million US to $2 million in 2007.

Freddy Head has won this race twice as a jockey and three times as a trainer.

There is no official stakes record for the Breeders' Cup Mile as it is run on different racecourses each year, some of which are significantly faster than others. In 2012, Wise Dan set a then-course record at Santa Anita with his time of 1:31.78. Although Tourist ran faster than this with a time of 1:31.71 in 2016, he just missed the current Santa Anita course record of 1:31.69.

Automatic berths 
Beginning in 2007, the Breeders' Cup developed the Breeders' Cup Challenge, a series of races in each division that allotted automatic qualifying bids to winners of defined races. Each of the fourteen divisions has multiple qualifying races. Note though that one horse may win multiple challenge races, while other challenge winners will not be entered in the Breeders' Cup for a variety of reasons such as injury or travel considerations.

In the Mile division, runners are limited to 14 and there are up to eleven automatic berths. The 2022 "Win and You're In" races were:
 the L'Ormarins Queen's Plate, a Group 1 race run in January Kenilworth Race Course in South Africa
 the Gran Premio Club Hipico Falabella, a Grade 1 race run in May at Club Hipico in Chile
 the Shoemaker Mile, a Grade 1 race run in May at Santa Anita Park in California
 the Yasuda Kinen, a Grade 1 race run in June at Tokyo Racecourse in Japan
 the Queen Anne Stakes, a Group 1 race run in June at Royal Ascot in England
 the Sussex Stakes, a Group 1 race run in July at Goodwood Racecourse in England
 the Fourstardave Handicap, a Grade 1 race run in August at Saratoga in upstate New York
 the Prix Jacques Le Marois, a Group I race run in August at Deauville Racecourse in France
 the Woodbine Mile, a Grade 1 race run in September at Woodbine Racetrack in Canada 
 the Coolmore Turf Mile Stakes, a Grade 1 race at Keeneland in Kentucky
 the Queen Elizabeth II Stakes, a Group 1 race at Ascot in England

Records
Most wins:
 3 – Goldikova (2008, 2009, 2010)

Most wins by a jockey:
 3 – Olivier Peslier (2008, 2009, 2010)
 3 – John R. Velazquez (1998, 2012, 2017)

Most wins by a trainer:
 3 – Freddy Head (2008, 2009, 2010)

Most wins by an owner:
 6 – Flaxman Holdings / Niarchos family (1987, 1988, 1997, 2002, 2003, 2014)
 3 – Wertheimer et Frère (2008, 2009, 2010)

Winners 

† Indicates filly/mare

See also

 Breeders' Cup Mile "top three finishers" and starters
 Breeders' Cup World Thoroughbred Championships
 American thoroughbred racing top attended events

References

Racing Post:

External links
Ten Things You Should Know about the Breeders' Cup Mile at Hello Race Fans!
Three Great Moments: Breeders' Cup Mile at Hello Race Fans!

Mile
Open mile category horse races
Grade 1 turf stakes races in the United States
1984 establishments in California
Recurring sporting events established in 1984